Retail outsourcing is a form of business process outsourcing practiced in retail, logistic and restaurant business. It involves the contracting of the operations and responsibilities of transportation, cooking, customer servicing or settlement of accounts business processes to a third-party service provider. Such provider bears the ultimate responsibility for the proper execution of the designated functions at stores, warehouses or catering facilities. The service supplier carries out the internal (back office) and front office duties including recruiting, training and legalizing human resources, tracking their job conduct, reporting and solving the problems, performing daily production tasks. Retail outsourcing is typically contracted for operational segments requiring large amounts of unskilled work force in such spheres as shipment, cash desk processing, counter servicing, bread baking, meat and fish cutting, cleaning, dish washing, packing, boxing or bundling.

Initially, the concept of retail outsourcing has been conceived in Russia. It has fully matured by the end of the 2000s. Currently, retail outsourcing is practiced by all major Russian retailers. It accounts for more than 25% of their total business operations. Even the abolition of the contingent labor (2016) failed to impact these services significantly. It only put a ban on specific segments (primarily, cash desk processing) but left other parts almost intact.

Business process
Business terms
Information technology management
Outsourcing